

See also
 List of airlines of Burundi
 List of airports in Burundi

References

Burundi
Airlines